"Take Me to Your Leader" is the debut single by rock band Incubus, released in 1996. It is a re-recorded version of the original version from their 1995 debut album Fungus Amongus. The song was later re-recorded again for their 1997 EP Enjoy Incubus.

Music video
An official music video was made for the song, the band's first music video at that point. The video pays homage to the film The Gods Must Be Crazy and shows the band wandering through Los Angeles dressed as cavemen intercut with footage of the band performing live. The video can be found on the band's DVD When Incubus Attacks Volume 2.

Live performance
The song was a staple in the band's setlist early on, however, along with other funk-based Fungus Amongus songs, it soon vanished from the band's setlist by the end of the 90s. In 2004 the band performed the song live for the first time in 6 years during a concert in London, England, much to fans' delight, with the band going on to play the song 9 times that year. It is to date the last Fungus Amongus/Enjoy Incubus song to be played live.

Music and lyrics
The main difference between the 1995 and re-recorded versions is the presence of DJ Lyfe. Notably, the 2004 performances were also done at a slower pace, and lacked the rapping segments which were present in the recorded versions.

The song's lyrics contain references to cocaine and other drugs.

Credits

Incubus
 Brandon Boyd – lead vocals
 Mike Einziger – guitar, backing vocals
 Alex Katunich – bass
 José Pasillas – drums

Other personnel
 DJ Lyfe – turntables, keyboards on the re-recording

External links

References

1995 songs
1996 debut singles
Immortal Records singles
Incubus (band) songs
Songs written by Brandon Boyd
Songs written by Mike Einziger
Songs written by Alex Katunich
Songs written by José Pasillas
Nu metal songs
Funk metal songs